The Holland class was a class of six protected cruisers of the Royal Netherlands Navy. The class was built in two groups, each consisting of three ships.

Design
The last three ships were slightly larger and displaced 133 tons more than the first three ships.
The ships had  deck armour. The main armament of the ships were two  single guns. Secondary armament included six single  guns and four  single guns. In 1914-1915 refits, the 5.9 in guns were removed from each ship and replaced with an additional four 4.7 in single mounts.

Construction
The class was built in two groups each consisting of three ships. The ships were laid down at Rijkswerf in Amsterdam, Koninklijke Maatschappij de Schelde in Flushing and Nederlandsche Stoomboot Maatschappij in Rotterdam.

Service history
Holland and Zeeland together with the coastal defence ships  ,  and  assisted the KNIL during the Aceh War. In 1908 Friesland, Gelderland and the coastal defence ship  were sent to patrol the Venezuelan coast during the second Castro crisis. Friesland and Utrecht were decommissioned in 1913 with the remaining four being modernized. During World War I all remaining ships were stationed in Dutch home waters. Holland and Zeeland were decommissioned in 1920 and 1924 while Noordbrabant became an accommodation ship in 1920. A role she fulfilled until she was damaged during the German invasion in World War II. Gelderland became a training ship in 1920. She was captured by Germany in 1940, renamed Niobe and sunk during the war in Kotka harbour in Finland on 16 July 1944.

Notes

References

Bibliography

External links

Gelderland and Noord Brabant at netherlandsnavy.nl
Description of class

Cruiser classes
 
19th-century naval ships of the Netherlands